The Berkeley Student Cooperative (BSC) (formerly known as University Students' Cooperative Association or the USCA) is a student housing cooperative serving primarily UC Berkeley students, but open to any full-time post-secondary student. The BSC houses and/or feeds over 1,300 students in 17 houses and three apartment buildings. Food is provided to residents of the 17 houses, which also offer boarding meal plans to non-residents. As part of their rental agreement, residents of the houses are required to perform workshifts, typically five hours per week. The BSC is led by a board of directors which is primarily composed of and elected by student members.

History 
In the beginning of 1933, to meet the need for affordable student housing during the Great Depression, Berkeley YMCA director Harry Lees Kingman inspired a group of students to start the first cooperative house in Berkeley, where student would do work-shifts in exchange for common food and lower rent. The house would be based on Rochdale Principles, which include: democratic control, common purchase of the cheapest available produce, open membership, market prices charged, political neutrality, limited interest on any invested capital, and return of savings to members in return for their investment. A rooming house became the first unit, with ten students becoming the first members and twelve more joining before the end of the semester.

In the fall of 1933, the students leased from Sigma Nu a Northside fraternity house, it became the original Barrington Hall housing 48 students. The following year, another fraternity house was leased, this time on Southside, it became Sheridan Hall housing 100 students. The two joined to form the University of California Students' Cooperative Association (UCSCA). In 1935, the Sigma Nu lease was allowed to expire and instead UCSCA leased Berkeley's largest apartment building located at 2315 Dwight Way, housing 200 members and took on the name Barrington Hall. USCA's third house opened the following year, a former inn on Northside Ridge street became Stebbins Hall, the first female unit housing 82 members. Next, Sherman Hall originally a sorority, Oxford a large apartment building and Atherton a smaller house next to Barington, were opened. Oxford would house 112 members and also became a central-kitchen, supplying daily meals to almost all of the houses.

As the US entered World War II the number of male students dropped significantly and Sherman and Atherton stopped operating. As California began forcefully relocating Japanese Americans from their homes, USCA agreed to assist and take over the lease on the Japanese Student Club's building. It became Lexington Hall, housing around 30 women prior to its return in 1948. On the other hand, Barrington Hall was temporarily rented to the Navy resulting in Oxford becoming the sole male residence. While previously deteriorating, under Navy's control Barrington underwent complete physical renovation.

Right after World War II, the UCSCA purchased Ridge House, formerly a mansion, and the year after that – Cloyne Court Hotel. Both properties were bought to house men as there was a sharp increase in the student population caused by the GI Bill. There would be 51 students at Ridge House and 150 at Cloyne Court Hotel. Several years later a former Inn was purchased, similar in structure and size, like Stebbins it was converted to an all female house. Several years later, due to changes in state law, the association could no longer have University of California in its name, and changed its name to the University Students' Cooperative Association (USCA). A smaller house – Kidd hall was purchased in 1960, and in 1966, USCA opened one of the first co-ed student housing projects in the nation – the Ridge Project.

In the 1960s and 1970s, Berkeley saw a decline in the popularity of the Greek System, which allowed the USCA to purchase defunct sororities which became Davis House, Andres Castro Arms, and Wolf House. The 1970s saw the opening of Lothlorien Hall, a vegetarian theme house, and Kingman Hall, both of which formerly housed New Age communities. Lothlorien was previously leased to the One World Family Commune and Kingman Hall was owned by the Berkeley Living Love Center. This decade also saw the construction and opening of the Rochdale Village Apartments, one of BSC's three apartment facilities. The others are Fenwick Weaver's Village and the Northside Apartments. BSC also owns two graduate and re-entry student houses, the Convent and Hillegass/Parker House, formerly Le Chateau. In 1987, due to its confusion with the Ridge House and the negative connotation of the word "project," the Ridge Project's name was changed to Casa Zimbabwe. 
In 1989, the members of the USCA voted to close Barrington Hall, its largest co-op, in reaction to complaints from neighbors and problems with the city. The following decade also saw the opening of two new theme houses: the African American Theme House, opened in response to the university's closing of all of its theme houses; and, in 1999, Oscar Wilde House. Oscar Wilde House is a former fraternity house, which the USCA was able to buy due to the continuing decline in the popularity of the Greek system in Berkeley.

In 2007, to make itself easier to find online, and to reflect a membership that also includes community college students, the organization changed its name to the Berkeley Student Cooperative (BSC).

Governance

The BSC is governed by a board of directors with 28 voting members. Each of the 17 houses and 3 apartment complexes elects a representative to a 12-month term approximately corresponding the UC Berkeley academic year. Larger houses may have up to 4 representatives. The BSC Alumni Association and Employees Association also each have one representative. At the recommendation of the President, the Board may also seat 1–2 members of the BSC Alumni Association and/or the UC Berkeley faculty as additional board members. Most decisions are made by majority vote.

The President and Vice presidents, who run committees that screen proposals for the Board, are student members elected by the board to 1-year terms. The BSC also has a permanent staff of approximately 20, including maintenance, office, and food warehouse employees. Staff supervises student managers who handle day-to-day management at the houses and apartment complexes. These managers are elected by their individual houses. Each house also holds councils every week or every other week to set house level policies and allocate house level budgets.

Central co-op services
In front of the Casa Zimbabwe building are the BSC's Central Office and the Central Kitchen and Central Maintenance facilities. Central Office handles all of the applications to BSC and determines where members will be placed. Placement is based on applicants eligibility, how long they have been a member of BSC, the member's preferences, and the number of vacancies in their preferred house(s). Central Kitchen handles and delivers the food orders for all of the houses but not the apartments. Food orders are handled on the house level by the Food or Kitchen Managers. Central Kitchen also handles the supply orders for all of the houses, such as toilet paper and cleaning supplies, as well as the furniture orders for both the houses and the apartments. Central Maintenance is responsible for major work on the houses, including major projects or renovations. Most minor work is handled by house Maintenance Managers. Permanent staff of the BSC is organized into a collective bargaining unit known as the Employee Association.

Priority for disadvantaged students
The BSC offers priority to students in the UC Berkeley Educational Opportunity Program (EOP) (or equivalent at their respective college or university), students with disabilities, transfer students, undocumented students, and international students studying abroad at a University of California campus.

Sustainability
At the house or apartment complex level, residents have the option of electing a "WRM" Waste-reduction Manager. These managers are responsible for recycling plastics, glass, paper, cardboard as well as composting. Waster-reduction Managers usually maintain color-coded bins, post information sheets and hold workshops/seminars to help residents make sustainable choices. WRMs can fine residents who do not follow house/apartment sustainability policies. The BSC also incorporates food waste reduction strategies into its food management system, by coordinating collections of compost. Cooperative living is sustainable in the sense that group living involves shared meals and facilities that can contribute to less waste, reduction in resource use, and collaboration in sustainable efforts.

Properties
The BSC currently operates 20 houses and apartments (of which it owns 16), housing and/or feeding over 1300 students and ranging from small houses of 17 residents to large houses of over 100 residents. The BSC also owns the former site of Barrington Hall, which it leases to a for-profit landlord.

Historical buildings 
BSC properties date back as far as 1904 with several of the buildings are considered to be architectural highlights of the city. Two of them are now considered as architectural landmarks: Cloyne Court built in 1904 and designated by National Register of Historic Places in 1992, and Kingman Hall built in 1914 and designated by Berkeley Landmark Preservation in 1999. BSC's other notable buildings include Ridge House designed by John Galen Howard, and three buildings designed by architect Julia Morgan - Davis Hall, Wolf House and African American Theme House (Castro).

Ridge House 
The Ridge House is a faux Tudor mansion built in 1906 during the Beaux-Arts architecture movement by John Galen Howard. Who was supervising architect of the Master Plan for the University of California, Berkeley campus, and founding the University of California's architecture program. Among his buildings are the Campanile, California Memorial Stadium, Sather Gate, and the Hearst Greek Theatre. He was also the architect of another BSC house - Cloyne Court Hotel. The Ridge House is located in Northside, one block North of the university. It sits atop Holy Hill, the area in the vicinity of a five-way intersection surrounded on all sides by churches and seminaries, such as Graduate Theological Union. It was built for University's economics and political science professor Adolf Miller and changed hands several times before being bought by the BSC in 1945; where it now houses 38 students. Although retrofitted for the student housing, there are still working fireplaces, exposed, half-timber redwood beams, along with a secret stairway.

Davis House, Wolf House and Person of Color Theme House 
Julia Morgan was the first woman architect licensed in California, and her first employment was with Howard assisting him with the University of California Master Plan; she was the primary designer for the Hearst Greek Theatre. During this time she was also the architect of three building owned by the BSC - Davis House, Wolf House and Person of Color Theme House (formerly known as Andres Castro Arms). 
Davis House is located at 2833 Bancroft Steps, Southside of campus, on a pedestrian pathway between it and the Alpha Phi sorority, also being close to International House and California Memorial Stadium. It holds 36 residents and is considered to be the finest residence at BCS. Referred to as "the retirement home, " as it is occupied by co-opers who have been part of the BSC system for the longest time. The building was originally built in 1913 as the Richard Clark house, a single-family mansion, built for the family of Richard Clark an associate of William Randolph Hearst. The beautiful interiors are described by Sara Holmes Boutelle in her book Julia Morgan: Architect: "Morgan gave free play to her love of complexity in the wood-paneled living room, dining room, and library, all of which have fireplaces with elaborate mantels. The living-room mantel is carved of oak, showing acorns, leaves, birds, and squirrels; another has classical details; brackets in the hall and on yet another fireplace, in the library, repeat the Tudor rose." With the completion of Memorial Stadium in 1923 and the International House in 1929, the neighborhood transferred from one of quiet, expensive mansions into a student-oriented neighborhood dominated by sorority and fraternity houses. At some point the house became a sorority Alpha Xi Delta and several additions were made to the building, including a sleeping porch with a deck above that features an expansive view of San Francisco Bay and the Golden Gate Bridge. In the 1960s, the popularity of the Greek system in Berkeley saw a steady decline. Many sorority and fraternity houses were forced to close for want of members, including Davis. In 1969, BSC purchased the building, one of several former Greek houses it acquired during this era. Davis Hall opened to residents in January 1970. Like all co-ops, each member had a five-hour work shift every week, and for seven of the members, cooking dinner was the shift, at the time this stood out from the other houses who's food was delivered from the central kitchen.

Wolf House houses 29 residents, located one house down from Piedmont Avenue, between the Wright Institute and Kappa Kappa Gamma, and two blocks from the University of California. It can be considered as part of the 'frat row' on the Southside area of Berkeley, area dominated by sororities and fraternities. Built for the Rector of St. Mark's Church, the Rev. Edward L. Parsons, in 1905 and originally situated just east of Telegraph Avenue on Durant at 2532. In 1915, with the commercialization of Telegraph, the family of Rev. Parsons decided to have the house moved up Durant Avenue to 2732. The front porch became enclosed and under Morgan's supervision the location of the front door changed to fit the lot. In 1924, when Rev. Parsons became the Episcopal Bishop of California, the family moved to San Francisco, the house was first rented and later sold. It was the location of a sorority before being bought by BSC in 1974. In 2002, to make the building accessible to disabled residents, BSC added a ramp that ran the length of the house along Durant to the front door, bisecting the front stairs.

Person of Color Theme House (Castro) houses 56 residents and is located at 2310 Prospect Street close to Davis house, on the other side of Alpha Phi. Its most distinguishing external feature is the three-story red brick staircase leading up to the Warring Street entrance. Built in 1911, it was designed in the Mediterranean style for metallurgist Charles Washington Merrill, with the view of the bay being the centerpiece of its design. It originally featured an S-shaped driveway running up the steep hill to the house and the interior was elaborately decorated with redwood, pine and oak paneling, similar to the interior of Davis. This changed in the 1930s, when the house was bought by the Zeta Tau Alpha sorority, which stripped the interiors of the woodwork and enclosed the front porch in glass. In the 1950s, it added a northwest wing. Eventually, like other Greek houses in ZTA was unable to attract enough members to remain open. BSC purchased the building in 1971, and decided to name the house in honor of long-time central kitchen cook Andres Castro, who was seriously ill at the time, but later recovered. It became Person of Color Theme House (Castro) in 2016.

Houses

Apartments
All BSC apartment units are wheelchair accessible.

Defunct co-ops
The following facilities were once owned and/or operated by the BSC, but are now closed or otherwise defunct.
Rooming house on the Southside (Spring 1933)
The first Barrington Hall (1933–1935)
Second Barrington Hall (1935–1943; 1950–1989)
Sheridan Hall (1934–1943)
Atherton (1937–~1942)
Oxford Hall (1938–1977), original location of Central Kitchen (CK), leased until purchase in 1963
The first Kingman Hall (Likely the late 1930s–1946) (same location as the first Barrington Hall)
Lexington Hall (1942–1948), leased from the Japanese Students Club in response to the internment of Japanese-Americans during World War II; building later purchased and became Euclid Hall
The first Rochdale (1943–1945), a 16-woman leasehold house
House in San Francisco's Buena Vista neighborhood (1944–1957)
Eisenfitz, Clod-haven, and Ridge Annex (1959–1960)
Le Chateau (1977–2005), converted to Hillegass-Parker House in response to lawsuit

Famous BSC alumni
Beverly Cleary (1936–1938, Stebbins Hall), author of children's books, most notably the Ramona series
Narsai David (1953–1955, Cloyne Court), chief, author and food correspondent for KCBS AM radio in San Francisco
Andreas Floer (1983–1985, Barrington Hall), German-American mathematician, Floer homology
Nathan Huggins (1952–1954, Oxford Hall), the first W. E. B. Du Bois Professor of History and Afro-American Studies and Director of the Du Bois Institute for Afro-American Research at Harvard University
Ed Masuga (1999–2002, Le Chateau), singer, musician, and songwriter
Norman Mineta (1949–1950, Ridge House), United States Secretary of Transportation under President George W. Bush, namesake of the San Jose International Airport
Peter Montgomery (1967–1971, Cloyne Court), Mathematician
Gordon Moore (1950, Cloyne Court), Intel co-founder
Leon F. Litwack (1948-1951, boarder, Oxford House, Ridge House and Cloyne Court), Pulitzer Prize winner, former University of California, Berkeley History Professor
Nancy Skinner (California politician), Barrington Hall

See also
Berkeley Student Food Collective (BSFC)
Network of Bay Area Worker Cooperatives (NoBAWC)
North American Students of Cooperation (NASCO)

Notes

References

External links

The Green Book—a collection of BSC history.

 
Cooperatives in the San Francisco Bay Area
Organizations based in Berkeley, California
Student housing cooperatives in the United States
Student organizations established in 1933
1933 establishments in California
History of Berkeley, California
Residential buildings in Alameda County, California
University of California, Berkeley